Revenge Prank is an American reality television series hosted by Pauly D and Vinny Guadagnino, featuring prank victims who are given the chance to exact their revenge on the friend, family member or loved one who originally embarrassed them. The show's first season premiered on June 25, 2020, on MTV.

The series sparked controversy online on the subjects of credibility and on the emotional effects of the pranks.

Synopsis

Episodes

Series overview

Season 1 (2020–21)

Ratings

 Live +7 ratings were not available, so Live +3 ratings have been used instead.

References

External links
  on MTV
 

2020s American comedy television series
2020s American reality television series
2020 American television series debuts
English-language television shows
MTV reality television series
Jersey Shore
American hidden camera television series